John Elsworthy (26 July 1931 – 3 May 2009) was a Welsh footballer. A midfielder, he was signed by Ipswich Town manager Scott Duncan in May 1949, after playing as an amateur for Newport County. He played all his professional club football for Ipswich Town. He won four championship medals during Ipswich's rise up the divisions in the 1950s. As a member of Ipswich, he won Division Three (South) in 1953–54 and 1956–57, Division Two in 1960–61, and the Division One league championship in 1961–62. He was selected to play for the Third division South representative team in 1956–57.

Elsworthy was part of the Wales squad for the 1958 FIFA World Cup in Sweden, but didn't travel to Sweden as the Welsh FA were too short of money to send a full squad. Although a member of the World Cup squad, Elsworthy was in fact never capped by his country. In all competitions, he played 435 games and scored 53 goals for Ipswich Town between 1949 and 1965. He was an inductee of the Ipswich Hall of Fame.

After retiring from football he ran a post office branch in Ipswich. In his later years, he suffered from Alzheimer's disease. He died in May 2009, aged 77.

Honours
Ipswich Town
Football League First Division: 1961–62
Football League Second Division: 1960–61
Football League Third Division South: 1953–54, 1956–57

Individual
Ipswich Town Hall of Fame: Inducted 2008

See also
List of one-club men in association football

References

1931 births
2009 deaths
Deaths from Alzheimer's disease
Deaths from dementia in England
Ipswich Town F.C. players
English Football League players
Newport County A.F.C. players
People from Usk
Sportspeople from Monmouthshire
Welsh footballers
1958 FIFA World Cup players
Association football wing halves